The Secret of China is a 2019 Chinese historical film directed by Wang Jixing and written by Tang Xi. The film stars Wang Pengkai as Mao Zedong and Kenan Heppe as Edgar Snow. Cast includes Li Xuejian, Li Youbin and Jiang Wenli. The film premiered at Diaoyutai State Guesthouse in Beijing on July 24, 2019, and opened in China on August 8, 2019.  It is base on Red Star Over China by Edgar Snow.

Cast
 Wang Pengkai as Mao Zedong
 Kenan Heppe as Edgar Snow
 Li Xuejian as Lu Xun
 Li Youbin
 Jiang Wenli as Song Qingling

Production
Wang Jixing (Jiao Yulu) was hired as the Director and Han Mei (Party chief and chairman of the board of Emei Film Group Co., Ltd.) was hired as the Chief Producer. Wang Jixing asked Li Xuejian to join the cast as Lu Xun.

Most of the film was shot on location in Shaanxi, Gansu, Shanghai and Beijing.

Release
Theatrical release will be on August 8, 2019.

References

External links
 
 
 

2019 films
Chinese historical films
Films shot in Shaanxi
Films shot in Gansu
Films shot in Shanghai
Films shot in Beijing
Films set in Shanghai
Films set in Beijing
Films set in Gansu
Films set in Shaanxi
2010s historical films
2010s Mandarin-language films